The Iron River is a  river in Marquette County on the Upper Peninsula of Michigan in the United States. It is a short stream flowing from the outlet of Lake Independence east to Lake Superior.

See also
List of rivers of Michigan

References

Michigan  Streamflow Data from the USGS

Rivers of Michigan
Rivers of Marquette County, Michigan
Tributaries of Lake Superior